In combinatorics, the rule of product or multiplication principle is a basic counting principle (a.k.a. the fundamental principle of counting).  Stated simply, it is the intuitive idea that if there are a ways of doing something and b ways of doing another thing, then there are a · b ways of performing both actions.

Examples

In this example, the rule says: multiply 3 by 2, getting 6.

The sets {A, B, C} and {X, Y} in this example are disjoint sets, but that is not necessary.  The number of ways to choose a member of {A, B, C}, and then to do so again, in effect choosing an ordered pair each of whose components are in {A, B, C}, is 3 × 3 = 9.

As another example, when you decide to order pizza, you must first choose the type of crust: thin or deep dish (2 choices). Next, you choose one topping: cheese, pepperoni, or sausage (3 choices).

Using the rule of product, you know that there are 2 × 3 = 6 possible combinations of ordering a pizza.

Applications
In set theory, this multiplication principle is often taken to be the definition of the product of cardinal numbers.  We have

where  is the Cartesian product operator.  These sets need not be finite, nor is it necessary to have only finitely many factors in the product; see cardinal number.

An extension of the rule of product considers there are  different types of objects, say sweets, to be associated with  objects, say people. How many different ways can the people receive their sweets?

Each person may receive any of the  sweets available, and there are  people, so there are  ways to do this.

Related concepts
The rule of sum is another basic counting principle.  Stated simply, it is the idea that if we have a ways of doing something and b ways of doing another thing and we can not do both at the same time, then there are a + b ways to choose one of the actions.

See also 

Combinatorial principles

References 

Combinatorics
Mathematical principles

fi:Todennäköisyysteoria#Tuloperiaate ja summaperiaate